Eustace Abington (by 1524 – 1569 or later), of Calais and Hertfordshire, was an English politician.

Career
Abington was a Member of Parliament for Calais in 1545. There is a record of his burial in the parish register of St. Dunstan-in-the East, London, on 8 May 1579.

References

16th-century deaths
People from Calais
People from Hertfordshire
English MPs 1545–1547
Members of the Parliament of England (pre-1707) for Calais
Year of birth uncertain